Cynthia Stone Creem (born September 17, 1942) is an American politician serving in the Massachusetts Senate. She represents the 1st Middlesex and Norfolk district, which includes Newton (her hometown), Brookline and parts of Wellesley. She is a Democrat who has served since 1999. Prior to serving in the Massachusetts legislature, she was an attorney who served on the Massachusetts Executive Council and the Newton Board of Aldermen. In late 2011 Creem considered running for Massachusetts's Fourth District seat in the United States Congress to replace retiring Rep. Barney Frank, ultimately won by Joseph P. Kennedy III in November 2012, but decided to remain in the Massachusetts Senate.

On February 28, 2018, Creem was elevated to the position of majority leader in the state senate.

Creem is a practicing family law attorney serving Of Counsel at the Boston law firm Sugarman, Rogers, Barshak & Cohen.

Political career
In 2018, Creem, along with Senator Anne Gobi, led the fight to pass H.4671, an act automatically registering eligible voters and enhancing safeguards against fraud. The bill created a framework for eligible voters to automatically register to vote when receiving services form the Register of Motor Vehicles and MassHealth. The bill also applies existing penalties for voter fraud to a fine of up to $10,000 or a five-year prison sentence.

References

1942 births
21st-century American politicians
21st-century American women politicians
Boston University School of Law alumni
Living people
Democratic Party Massachusetts state senators
Politicians from Newton, Massachusetts
Women state legislators in Massachusetts